The Opportunities of Rosa (also known as Rosa's Chance) is a 1981 Italian drama film directed by Salvatore Piscicelli. For her performance in this film Marina Suma, here at her film debut, won a David di Donatello for best new actress.

Cast 
Marina Suma as Rosa
Angelo Cannavacciuolo as Gino
 Gianni Prestieri

See also  
 List of Italian films of 1981

References

External links

1981 films
Italian drama films
Films directed by Salvatore Piscicelli
1980s Italian-language films
1980s Italian films